Ekraveien is the last Oslo Metro station on the Røa Line within Oslo's city limits. It is between the stations Røa and Eiksmarka. It was opened 22 December 1948 when the Røa Line was extended to Grini.

Ekraveien itself is a road which runs north from the station to Bogstad. The neighborhood around the station is residential, consisting mostly of detached housing.

References

External links

Oslo Metro stations in Oslo
Railway stations opened in 1948
1948 establishments in Norway